Copelatus parumstriatus is a species of diving beetle. It is part of the genus Copelatus in the subfamily Copelatinae of the family Dytiscidae. It was described by Gschwendtner in 1934.

References

parumstriatus
Beetles described in 1934